Curtis Anthony Tilt (born 4 August 1991) is a professional footballer who plays as a defender for Wigan Athletic. Born in England, he represented Jamaica at international level.

Club career
Born in Walsall, Tilt was working in a quarry and had largely stopped playing football when he was spotted by Gornal Athletic playing in a tournament organised by Sporting Khalsa. After one season with Gornal he left to join Tipton Town in the summer of 2013, but then moved on again to Halesowen Town in September of the same year. After two seasons with Halesowen, Tilt moved on to Hednesford Town in 2015, before signing for Wrexham in June 2016, and moving on loan to Forest Green Rovers in March 2017. He signed for Blackpool in June 2017.

Tilt signed for Rotherham United on 31 January 2020 for an undisclosed fee.

In October 2020 Tilt moved on loan to Wigan Athletic. On 30 January 2021, he rejoined Wigan Athletic on loan for the remainder of the 2020–21 season. He scored his first goal for Wigan in a 3–2 loss to AFC Wimbledon on 6 February 2021.

He re-joined Wigan Athletic for a third loan spell on loan on 31 August 2021. Although the loan was originally until the end of the season, Rotherham exercised the option to recall in the January transfer window on 14 January 2021. He returned to Wigan later that month on a permanent deal.

International career
In March 2021 he was one of six English-born players to receive their first call-up to the Jamaica national team. On 25 March 2021, he made his Jamaica debut when he came on in the 64th minute of a 4–1 defeat to the USA.

Personal life
Tilt was born in England and is of Jamaican descent.

Career statistics

Club

International

References

1991 births
Living people
Sportspeople from Walsall
English footballers
Jamaican footballers
Jamaica international footballers
Association football defenders
Gornal Athletic F.C. players
Tipton Town F.C. players
Halesowen Town F.C. players
Hednesford Town F.C. players
AFC Telford United players
Wrexham A.F.C. players
Forest Green Rovers F.C. players
Blackpool F.C. players
Rotherham United F.C. players
Wigan Athletic F.C. players
English Football League players
English people of Jamaican descent